Madhesi Janadhikar Forum (translates to Madhesi People's Rights Forum) may refer to:
 Madheshi Jana Adhikar Forum, Nepal (Loktantrik)
 Madheshi Jana Adhikar Forum, Nepal